The 1973 United States Grand Prix was a Formula One motor race held on October 7, 1973 at the Watkins Glen Grand Prix Race Course in Watkins Glen, New York. It was race 15 of 15 in both the 1973 World Championship of Drivers and the 1973 International Cup for Formula One Manufacturers.

The 59-lap race was won from pole position by Ronnie Peterson, driving a Lotus-Ford. Peterson held off James Hunt in the Hesketh-entered March-Ford to take his fourth victory of the season, with Carlos Reutemann third in a Brabham-Ford.

The race was overshadowed by the death of François Cevert during qualifying, in what was to have been the 100th and final Grand Prix for Tyrrell team-mate and triple World Champion Jackie Stewart. The Tyrrell team withdrew from the event as a consequence, handing the Manufacturers' Cup to Lotus.

Summary
Ronnie Peterson ended his first year with Lotus by taking his fourth win of the season, as a thrilling two-man battle ended with Peterson beating James Hunt to the flag by the smallest winning margin in USGP history at that time. The Englishman finished less than a second behind in his Hesketh Racing entered March, but the normal celebrations were tempered by the death of François Cevert during qualifying and the premature end of the career of three-time World Champion Jackie Stewart.

Death of François Cevert
Stewart had already clinched his third World Driver's Championship when the teams came to Watkins Glen, and he intended the final Grand Prix of 1973 to be his swan song. "I had decided in April that I would retire at the end of the season, win or lose," Stewart recalled. "Watkins Glen was going to be my last race in a Formula One car. François Cevert was going to be number one in the team for 1974, although he never knew it. Ken Tyrrell and I had kept it a secret that I was going to retire after that race. In fact, not even my wife, Helen, who was with me that weekend, knew."

With just a few minutes left in the Saturday morning qualifying session, however, the track suddenly fell quiet. Cevert had crashed violently in the uphill Esses heading onto the back of the circuit, between Turns Three and Four. Fighting the car as he went up the hill, Cevert ran too high on the kerbs and slid into the right hand guardrail. The car then lashed sideways across the track and struck the Armco on the left side of the track at 150 mph at an almost 90 degree angle. The nose of the car submarined into the ground, causing the car to flip upwards on over the barrier, which ripped off the front of the car, which landed in the middle of the track while the rear of the car came to rest upside down on top of the Armco.

Jody Scheckter's McLaren was close behind, and he stopped and rushed over to help Cevert out of the car, but when the front of the car had been ripped off, Cevert had been exposed to making direct physical contact with the barrier and had died instantly. Ken Tyrrell had lost a great driver and Jackie Stewart an outstanding teammate at the circuit where Cevert had taken his only Grand Prix win. "It was a horrendous accident which took the life of a wonderfully charming, personable, handsome young man, who was a tremendous friend to both Helen and me," Stewart said.

When qualifying resumed, Peterson's time from the morning session stood up for his ninth pole of the year. The Tyrrells of Stewart and Chris Amon had earned the fifth and twelfth spots on the grid, but the team decided to withdraw in tribute to Cevert, and Stewart's driving career was over after 99 races and what was then a record 27 Grand Prix wins.

Race
On Sunday, a huge crowd turned out on a cool, overcast day for the race. On the grid, in seventh spot, home favorite Peter Revson felt his car creeping forward as the flag was raised. Rather than hold it with the brakes, he took it out of gear just as the flag dropped. He waved his arms in the air and waited for the field to roar past, then set off in last place.

The front runners got away well, and at the end of the first lap, Peterson led Carlos Reutemann, Hunt, Emerson Fittipaldi, Mike Hailwood and Scheckter. On lap 4, Hunt passed Reutemann for second, and began his chase of Peterson's Lotus. To the surprise of everyone as the race progressed, Hunt was able to stay around one second behind Peterson. Occasionally the gap would widen slightly, but again and again, the extreme straightline speed of the Hesketh March would close it again.

Reutemann kept pace as well, two to three seconds behind Hunt, until he lost nine seconds attempting to lap Graham Hill. From then on, he ran a lonely race to a third-place finish.

Revson, meanwhile, was rocketing through the field from his last place start, and at the midway point, he had gone from twenty-third to seventh. He took sixth from Emerson on lap 40 when the Brazilian pitted to replace his front tyres that were flat-spotted when he had to avoid a spinning Scheckter.

For the last 15 laps, Hunt continued to follow Peterson, between .7 and 1.4 seconds behind. He pulled alongside at one point, but could not finish the pass. "I looked over at Ronnie, and he looked fiercer than me," he explained after the race.

Hunt had decided to bide his time until the final 10 laps, then make a bid to pass Peterson, but his car developed oversteer with a lightening fuel load. This kept him from taking the final corner before the back straight flat out, and effectively took away his speed advantage. He maintained the challenge to the flag, however, setting the fastest lap of the race on the penultimate lap. Peterson's winning margin of 0.688 seconds was the smallest in United States Grand Prix history until 2002.

Reutemann had to weave to the line, virtually out of fuel, but held on to third; Denny Hulme ran a steady race to fourth; Revson made it up to fifth with his splendid drive from last place; and Emerson Fittipaldi took sixth after having to stop for tyres. Having already secured the Manufacturers' Cup following Tyrrell's withdrawal, Lotus finished ten points ahead, despite Stewart taking the Drivers' Championship for Tyrrell.

Classification

Qualifying

Race

Championship standings after the race

Drivers' Championship standings

Constructors' Championship standings

References

Further reading
 Doug Nye (1978). The United States Grand Prix and Grand Prize Races, 1908-1977. B. T. Batsford. 
 "15th U.S. Grand Prix: Easy One For Ronnie". (January, 1974). Road & Track, 64-67.

United States Grand Prix
United States Grand Prix
United States Grand Prix
United States Grand Prix
United States Grand Prix